Tumbez, Virginia, is a small cluster of homes and farms at a fork in the road in the southwestern edge of Russell County in the U.S. state of Virginia. It was the home of mountain music fiddler Uncle Charlie Osborne.

References

[ "Tumbez"]. Retrieved 31 January 2006.

Geography of Russell County, Virginia